Phalerarcha chrysorma is a species of sedge moth, and the only species in the genus Phalerarcha. It was described by Edward Meyrick in 1913. It is found in Guyana.

References

Moths described in 1913
Glyphipterigidae